Orajärvi is medium-sized lake in the Kemijoki main catchment area in Finland. It is located in Sodankylä municipality, in the eastern Lapland region.

Orajärvi is also a village comprising Orakylä, Hirviäkuru, Välisuvanto and Tepsanniemi. The population is 250. Orajärvi lake is also located there.

There are three other Orajärvi lakes in Finland, in the municipalities of Pello, Jyväskylä and Espoo.

See also
List of lakes in Finland

References

Lakes of Sodankylä